Janusz Surdykowski (born 4 May 1986) is a Polish professional footballer who plays as a striker for KP Starogard Gdański.

Career

Club
In June 2006, he joined Górnik Łęczna on a four-year contract. In July 2007, he was loaned to Podbeskidzie Bielsko-Biała. He returned to Górnik half year later.

In August 2010, he signed a contract with APEP F.C.

In July 2011, he moved to Arka Gdynia.

On 28 August 2020, he signed with Olimpia Elbląg.

References

External links
 

1986 births
Sportspeople from Gdańsk
Living people
Polish footballers
Poland under-21 international footballers
Association football forwards
Polonia Warsaw players
Amica Wronki players
Górnik Łęczna players
Podbeskidzie Bielsko-Biała players
APEP FC players
Arka Gdynia players
Bytovia Bytów players
Chojniczanka Chojnice players
Olimpia Elbląg players
Ekstraklasa players
I liga players
II liga players
III liga players
Polish expatriate footballers
Expatriate footballers in Cyprus
Polish expatriate sportspeople in Cyprus